W3Schools is a freemium educational website for learning coding online. Initially released in 1998, it derives its name from the World Wide Web but is not affiliated with the W3 Consortium. W3Schools offers courses covering all aspects of web development. W3Schools also publishes free HTML templates. It is run by Refsnes Data in Norway. It has an online text editor called TryIt Editor, and readers can edit examples and run the code in a test environment.

Functions 
On the site, source code examples with explanations are shown free of charge in English, most of which can also be edited and executed interactively in a live editor. Other important code elements are hidden so that the user can focus on the code shown (developer sandbox). The tutorials are divided into individual chapters on the development languages. In addition to the basics, application-related implementation options and examples, as well as a focus on individual elements of the programming language (so-called "references") are documented. In addition, there is a YouTube channel, which takes up and explains certain topics in web development, and an Internet forum. The languages HTML, CSS, JavaScript, JSON, PHP, AngularJS, SQL, Bootstrap, Node.js, jQuery, XQuery, Ajax, and XML are supported.

See also 
 MDN Web Docs – similar website

References

External links 

 

Internet properties established in 1998
Computing websites
Web design
Norwegian educational websites
Software companies of Norway